Malaya Sidorova is a rural locality (a village) in Beloyevskoye Rural Settlement, Kudymkarsky District, Perm Krai, Russia. The population was 43 as of 2010.

Geography 
Malaya Sidorova is located 44 km northwest of Kudymkar (the district's administrative centre) by road. Bolshaya Sidorova is the nearest rural locality.

References 

Rural localities in Kudymkarsky District